Alexus Lucienne Laird (born 11 March 1993) is an American-Seychellois swimmer. At the 2016 Summer Olympics she competed in the Women’s 100 m backstroke.

References

External links
 
 

Olympic swimmers of Seychelles
1993 births
Living people
Sportspeople from Kokomo, Indiana
Swimmers at the 2016 Summer Olympics
Seychellois female swimmers
American female swimmers
American female backstroke swimmers
African Games bronze medalists for Seychelles
African Games medalists in swimming
Swimmers at the 2015 African Games
Female backstroke swimmers